Filipo Bureta (born 5 March 1983) is a Samoan footballer who plays as a defender for Clendon United in the Auckland Football Federation & Northern League Conference competition.

References

1983 births
Living people
Samoan footballers
Association football defenders
Samoa international footballers
2016 OFC Nations Cup players
Expatriate soccer players in Australia
Samoan expatriate sportspeople in Australia